is a fighting game developed and published by Namco for the arcades in 2004, and for the PlayStation 2 in 2005. It is the fifth main and sixth installment, in the Tekken series, marking the tenth anniversary of the series. The game is set shortly after the ending of Tekken 4 showing a new person taking over the zaibatsu special forces while a sidestory focuses on the protagonist Jin Kazama as he faces several enemies from the G Corporation.

The game removes several major gameplay changes introduced in Tekken 4, such as uneven stage terrain, in favor of a faster gameplay akin to the older games in the series. It is also the first game in the series to feature the ability to customize characters with accessories, clothing, and other aesthetic items purchased with in-game currency. There are up to 32 characters to choose from, including seven new fighters, as well as Jin's alter-ego Devil Jin. The home version includes a mode known as Devil Within, a variant of Tekken Force introduced in Tekken 3.

The game was upgraded to Tekken 5.1, which had mostly balance changes to the gameplay, and later the update Tekken 5: Dark Resurrection which was released in 2005 and later ported to the PlayStation Portable and the PlayStation 3 as Tekken: Dark Resurrection. Tekken 5 was a critical and commercial success, selling over 8.2 million copies including expansion. Critics praised the return of classic gameplay features and the large amount of replay value provided by the PlayStation 2 port though the final boss was criticized for being too powerful while Jin's story mode was felt boring in comparison to the fighting game part. A sequel titled Tekken 6 was released in 2007.

Gameplay
New to Tekken 5 is the hot system which affects the vulnerability of character while they attack. For example, a move with jumping properties, such as a hop-kick, will be completely invulnerable during most of its animation time to all of an opponent's low attacks. It also retains its wall juggling concept from Tekken 4, but the element is effectively more difficult to abuse and easier to defend against. The home version is a collector's edition of sorts, as it includes the arcade versions of Tekken, Tekken 2, Tekken 3, and StarBlade. Tekken 5 also allows players to customize their fighter for the first time, allowing them to change the colors of their outfits, buy additional costumes, and equip them with items by using money gained from playing the Story, Survival, Time Attack, the side-story Devil Within, and Arcade Battle modes.

The raised and lowered sections of floors featured in the Tekken 4 levels were removed for the fifth installment. This change made gameplay throughout each stage generally similar, aside from wall placements. In addition to removing the uneven nature of the Tekken 4 styled stages, the design team returned to the style of stages from previous games by having some stages without barriers by allowing them to be infinitely scrolling. For walled stages, the fights take place in fairly symmetrical boxes without any uneven walls. Floors could also crack after one of the characters hit it hard enough. Only one part of a stage can be cracked at a time, however.

Other changes over the Tekken 4 design included the removal of the positional change techniques, bringing back traditional air combat and using a juggle system more akin to Tekken 3 as opposed to the 4th game's less juggle-friendly gameplay. The fighters were also forced to remain stationary prior to the round beginning.

The game also includes Devil Within mode. This is the fourth installment in the Tekken Force series (the first two instalments can be found in Tekken 3 and Tekken 4 respectively. Similar to Death by Degrees, 'Devil Within' focuses solely on one playable character, Jin Kazama, who can also transform into Devil Jin. This is a traditional platform game in which players must control Jin through a series of labyrinth style levels and entire enemy armies. This mode features bosses, such as True Ogre from Tekken 3, who is not playable in Tekken 5.

Plot
Set moments after Tekken 4s ending, Jin Kazama's departure from the Hon-Maru dojo, G Corporation helicopters approach and begin deploying Jack-4 machines pods into the building. Heihachi Mishima and his son, Kazuya, battle the Jacks together until Kazuya leaves Heihachi for dead while escaping. The Jacks hold down Heihachi while one activates its detonator, creating a huge explosion that seemingly kills Heihachi. The only witness to the event is Raven, a mysterious ninja clad in black, who relays Heihachi's death to his superiors. Heihachi's death is declared all over the world with everyone foreseeing the end of the Mishima Zaibatsu. However, somebody else takes over the company from the shadows and business continues.

Two months later, the King of Iron Fist Tournament 5 is announced. During the tournament, Kazuya crosses paths with Raven, who recognizes him after seeing him flying away from the Hon-Maru. Kazuya defeats Raven and interrogates him. When he makes Raven talk, Kazuya discovers that he was betrayed by G Corporation, and that something was awakened from under Hon-Maru. Kazuya realizes what Heihachi has done, and speculates that, in fact, it is his grandfather Jinpachi Mishima, Heihachi's father who was confined below Hon-Maru by Heihachi after a coup forty years ago. However, he was possessed by a vengeful spirit who granted him insurmountable power, after which he broke out of Hon-Maru during the Jacks' attacks. 

Hwoarang faced Jin and defeated him in the later stages of the tournament. While Jin was lying on the ground, suddenly, he roars paranormally and produces a gale that blows Hwoarang away. From Jin's back, two black wings spread, and Jin stands up in his devil form. Hwoarang is at his wits end. He is not able to fight back, and soon he is knocked unconscious. Presumably because Hwoarang could not continue, Jin was allowed to continue in his place, and progressed through the tournament. Ultimately, as revealed in the next game,  Jin manages to defeat Jinpachi, who dissolves into dust and disappears shortly after, with his wish being fulfilled. With this victory, Jin becomes the new head of the Mishima Zaibatsu, setting in motion the events of Tekken 6.

The game also offers an alternative storyline in the mode "Devil Within" where Jin hears that his missing mother, Jun, might be alive and goes to G Corporation to find her. During the mode, Jin awakens his devil persona which also provokes the resurrection of his nemesis, Ogre. Jin defeats Ogre and its stronger persona True Ogre which awakens the stronger Monstrous Ogre. The mode ends with Jin defeating Monstrous Ogre but fails to find Jun.

Characters
The game features a total of 32 playable characters, consisting of 26 returning and 6 new ones. Unlike previous games, the home version adds no new playable character, and the game's unplayable final boss from the arcades, Jinpachi Mishima, remains unplayable in the console version. The home version also has two uncontrollable enemies fought during the Devil Within minigame: Gun Jack and True Ogre.

New characters

The new characters include:
Asuka Kazama: A high school student practicing Kazama Style Traditional Martial Arts who enters the tournament to take revenge against Feng Wei for having injured her father and destroyed her family's dojo.
Devil Jin : The Devil form of Jin who uses Jin's old move set composed of his paternal family's martial arts.
Feng Wei: An arrogant prodigy of the God Fist style who searches through Japan for information about the scrolls of God Fist.
Jack-5: The fifth model of Jack series again sent by his creator, Jane to retrieve Jack-2's memories from Mishima Zaibatsu.
Jinpachi Mishima : The father of Heihachi who is resurrected from the dead by a vengeful spirit.
Raven: A mysterious ninja agent who is the first to report Heihachi Mishima's supposed demise.
Roger Jr. : The wife-and-son duo of boxing kangaroo Roger set out to rescue their husband/father from Mishima Zaibatsu.

Returning characters

Anna Williams 
Baek Doo San 
Bruce Irvin 
Bryan Fury
Christie Monteiro
Craig Marduk
Eddy Gordo  
Ganryu 
Gun Jack 
Heihachi Mishima 
Hwoarang
Jin Kazama
Julia Chang
Kazuya Mishima
King II
Kuma II 
Lee Chaolan
Lei Wulong
Ling Xiaoyu
Marshall Law
Mokujin 
Nina Williams
Panda  
Paul Phoenix
Steve Fox
True Ogre 
Wang Jinrei 
Yoshimitsu

 Unlockable character
 Unplayable boss
 Skin/palette swap
 Unplayable enemy in Devil Within mode

Development
After the release of Tekken 4, series director Katsuhiro Harada left Namco due to pressure with such game. Harada's boss insisted him to keep producing more titles as he was capable of pleasing people with his work. After a year away, Harada went back to the company explaining it was due to his passion with fighting games. Namco first announced Tekken 5 in E3 2004 during May. Harada aimed to make it the best game in the entire franchise to celebrate its 10th anniversary. He aimed to amplify the action elements of the games and make them more over-the-top. In regards to the handling of the game following the negative backlash of Tekken 4, Harada claims Namco used this response to develop the game. Namco also aimed to make the game fitting for newcomers. The early success of the arcade led the team to research for more content to add in future installments. Based on the company's revolutionary Dynamic Motion Synthesis technology, endorphin was chosen to implement an AI and dynamics simulation to create 3D character animation in real-time, thus dramatically accelerating 3D animation pipelines in games and visual effect studios. Shinichiro Yoda of Namco was optimisitic with this decision. Torsten Reil, CEO of NaturalMotion, said thaty were delighted by Namco as they had already put it in test for its first trailer. The arcade cabinet of the game was notable for allowing players to use their PlayStation 2 controlls over the regular arcade system. The team felt that for the first time in years, the franchise made a notable progress thanks to Tekken 5. 

The game was developed to be different from its predecessor. This was mostly due to negative feedback Tekken 4 received to the point of being considered the worst installment within the series. In contrast to Tekken Tag Tournament, 5 runs on a System 256, a stronger arcade, allowing the team to produce more detailed backgrounds and characters. This was done thanks to the new engine provided by Namco. Early in development, Namco promised gamers there would be a minigame on action adventure style mode similar to the one provided by Tekken 3.

Harada wanted the game to be enjoyable to newcomers as a result of multiple playable characters that might be difficult to master. A blur effect was added to the visuals while several stages were given flames. Early in the production, Tekken 5 was meant to have 20 playable characters, with the selected returning ones being the most popular ones. New movements were added to the returning cast. 600 items were also made for the idea of customization. Among the newcomers, Asuka Kazama stands as a replacement from the missing Jun Kazama who only appeared in Tekken 2 and Tag Tournament. Despite promotion from Tekken 5 claiming that the character has died in the intro, Namco Bandai denied this statement in interviews. Tekken 5 also makes every character to use their own native language during cutscenes, introductions to battles and victory scenes. Producer Takai Homma was in charge of this part of the game. Homma recalls having fun in giving the characters their respective lines as well subtitles. This also led to animal characters having their own lines which have to be read. The goal of Homma was surpassing the two previous Tekken games.

The CGI studio Digital Frontier, who had previously worked with Namco on earlier games, assisted with the creation of CGI cutscenes in the game.

Music
The game features a large cast of music composers, including Akitaka Tohyama, Yoshihito Yano, Yuu Miyake, Junichi Nakatsuru, Satoru Kōsaki, Rio Hamamoto, Ryuichi Takada, and Hiroshi Okubo. The same team also worked on the PS2 version, with the addition of Tetsukazu Nakanishi, Keiichi Okabe, Kohta Takahashi, Kazuhiro Nakamura, Keiki Kobayashi, Nobuyoshi Sano, and Katsuro Tajima. The opening song for the PS2 version, "Sparking", features vocals by Tom Leonard and Jeff Pescetto. The music encompasses many genres, including techno, rock and nu metal. Victor Entertainment released the soundtrack.

Ports
The PlayStation 2 port was made in order to contain everything from the original arcade alongside new content. This originated from fan response who often requested Namco that. Harada gave Kei Kudo the task of compressing the port version of the game properly. In October 2005, the game was re-released under the "Greatest Hits" label in Japan. The games was re-released as Tekken 5.1, a free upgrade to the arcade version of Tekken 5. It includes changes to the character life bars and character select screen, and some changes in character moves to improve game balance. For example, Steve Fox's infinite was removed, and a few other strong moves were toned down. The Devil Within was created as something only the port could carry.

Available in the version for the arcades, the PSP and the PlayStation 3 (via the PlayStation Network), Tekken 5: Dark Resurrection is an update of Tekken 5. It was officially announced at the 2005 JAMMA AM Show but news of it leaked slightly beforehand. The update Dark Resurrection would further add additional characters, more features, and customizations in addition to gameplay rebalancing. It was directed by Haruki Suzaki who aimed to turn Jinpachi into a playable character. The Japanese version took about two and a half months. The PlayStation 3 port proved difficult to port as a result of its different engine.

Reception

Critical response

Tekken 5 was met with mainly positive critical response, resulting in a score of 88 out of 100 at Metacritic. Several writers found its mechanics superior to its predecessor, Tekken 4, due to the return of classic mechanics and the importance of each stage as well as faster combat. The fact that Tekken 5 removed the exclusive features from its prequel was also a subject of praise. The new mechanics to customize the characters were praised and compared with the ones from Virtua Fighter 4. The new characters were also the subject of positive response due to the variety they provide. Addditionally, the PlayStation 2 port was heavily praised for the inclusion of the first three Tekken to play, which expanded the replay value.

Negative comments focused the Devil Within beat-em up due to poorly executed mechanics despite giving the player the possibility of using Devil Jin for the first time, with GameAxis Unwired calling it derivative of the Tekken Force mini-game from previous installment while GameRevolution compared it to the poorly received spin-off Death By Degrees. The final boss Jinpachi Mishima has often been criticized for how overpowered he can be to the point of often being rated as one of the worst bosses in gaming.

The presentation was the subject of positive response. The visuals were praised both for the improvement to the fights as well as the new CGI endings over real time cutsenes coupled with interludes and narration in the story mode, as well as improvements to bodies' textures to the point GameZone and GameSpot found it as a more faithful sequel to Tekken 3 than 4. The idea of having the characters speaking their native languages over English was well received. VideoGamer.com enjoyed the large amount of content player can unlock in the gallery mode too.

Tekken 5 was also awarded "Best Fighting Game of 2005" by GameSpot, and "Best PlayStation 2 Fighting Game" by IGN.

Legacy
Tekken 5 was ranked by Complex as the sixth best PlayStation 2 game. SNK staff member Falcoon said Tekken 5 was one of his favorite games in 2005 although he did not consider himself an expert in the game. Game designer Tomonobu Itagaki heavily panned the console port of the game for lacking innovative features after several installments from the franchise. Similarly, The Rough Guide to Videogames felt the story was convoluted and that the Devil Within was poorly done. PC Mag listed Paul Phoenix's and Lee Chaolan's endings as two of the "craziest" moments in the franchise.

The game's critical praise was matched with commercial success. As of July 2009, it has sold around 6 million copies. In retrospective, Harada believes Tekken 5, and Tekken 6, managed to attract a new group of fans, something Tekken 4 failed to do.  A sequel, Tekken 6, was released in 2007. The first CGI scene from the game also influenced the developers to create a film titled Tekken: Blood Vengeance (2011) which uses this type of animation.

Notes

References

External links
 (Arcade) 
 (PS2) 
Old official website  (archived)
Tekken 5 at MobyGames
Tekken 5 at The Killer List of Videogames

2004 video games
Arcade video games
Fighting games used at the Evolution Championship Series tournament
Fighting games used at the Super Battle Opera tournament
Interactive Achievement Award winners
Namco arcade games
Namco beat 'em ups
PlayStation 2 games
Tekken games
Video game sequels
Bandai Namco video game compilations
Video games developed in Japan
Video games scored by Junichi Nakatsuru
Video games scored by Satoru Kōsaki
Video games set in Tokyo
Video games set in Seoul
Video games set in Scotland
Video games set in China
Video games set in outer space
Video games set in Antarctica
Video games set in the United States